Sir George Charles Hawker (21 September 1818 – 21 May 1895) was a South Australian settler and politician.

Early life
Hawker was born in London, the second son of Admiral Edward Hawker and his first wife, Joanna Naomi, née Poore. He was educated partly on the continent, and he entered Trinity College, Cambridge, in 1836 (B.A.1841, M.A.  1854).

Career in Australia
Together with his brother Charles, Hawker went to South Australia in 1840 travelling aboard the Lysander. He had some capital to start with, and after trying two sites which were found to have insufficient water, established a sheep station some distance to the north of Adelaide (north of the Clare Valley), afterwards known as Bungaree. He had two brothers with him at first and all three soon adapted themselves to pioneer conditions; some of the early station buildings in fact were put up with their own hands. In 1841 they were members of a party of 10 that went out to reclaim a large number of sheep that had fallen into the hands of the Indigenous Australians. The Aboriginal Australians heavily outnumbered them and they were fortunate in escaping with the loss of one horse with one member of their party wounded. Hawker eventually bought out his brothers and extended his land until he had some 80,000 acres (32,000 ha). Much attention was paid to the breeding of his sheep, and his wool gained a high reputation.

In 1851 Hawker was a candidate for Stanley in the South Australian Legislative Council, but was defeated. In January 1858 Hawker entered the South Australian House of Assembly as member for the district of Victoria, and in April 1860, though a comparatively young man and opposed by Boyle Travers Finniss and Francis Stacker Dutton, was elected Speaker of the South Australian House of Assembly. He was successful in this position carrying out its duties with tact and dignity, and showing a good knowledge of parliamentary practice. He retired from parliament in 1865, went to England with his family, and did not return until 1874. He again entered parliament and, except for a few months, was a member until his death. He was twice asked to form a ministry and declined on each occasion, but several times held office. He was Treasurer of South Australia in the third Arthur Blyth ministry for a few days in 1875, and chief secretary in the second James Penn Boucaut ministry from March to June 1876. He was commissioner of public works in the third Boucaut ministry from October 1877 to September 1878, and held the same position in the William Morgan ministry until June 1881. In 1889 he visited India to inquire into the irrigation question, and on his return wrote a series of articles on this subject which appeared in the South Australian Register. He died on 21 May 1895 in Medindie; if he had lived a few days longer he would have been created K.C.M.G.; his widow's appeal for a posthumous award was approved by the Queen in September 1895, and she was known as Lady Hawker until her death.

Hawker held a leading position as a citizen of South Australia. Wealthy, and a good employer, he was much interested in the every day life of the colony, a follower of cricket, racing, and coursing, a supporter of the Agricultural and Horticultural Society (and its president from 1863 to 1864 and 1889 to 1890), and the Zoological Society. He was much respected in parliament through his long career of 26 years. In his earlier days Hawker was an excellent speaker who sometimes rose to eloquence, as an old man he contented himself with short speeches, which were, however, much to the point. He showed distinct administrative ability during his term as commissioner of public works.

Family

Admiral Edward Hawker  (7 November 1782 – 8 June 1860), of Ashford Lodge, Petersfield married Joanna Naomi Poore. They were the parents and grandparents of several notable pioneers of the Colony of South Australia:

George Charles Hawker married Elizabeth "Bessie" Seymour (died June 1901) on 16 December 1845, daughter of Henry Seymour, pastoralist at Naracoorte. Her younger sister Jane married pastoralist and politician William Spence Peter in 1856. George was about to be knighted when he died, consequently Bessie was granted the rank of the widow of a knight. Lady Hawker died in June 1901. They had six sons and six daughters, including:

Edward William Hawker (1850–1940), was MHA for Stanley 1884–1999 and 1893–1896. 
George Stanley Hawker M.C. (7 May 1894 – 17 February 1979) was MHA for Burra 1947–1956
Henry Colley "Harry" Hawker, Lieut., RN (14 August 1852 – c. 23  December 1912) married Julia Gordon Lanoe Hawker (1854–1927) in 1879
A. Seymour Hawker (1880–1953) married Irene De St Croix Wilkinson ( – ) in 1910. He was a mayor of Adelaide
Joan Seymour Hawker ( – ) married cousin John Carey Hawker (1904–1970) on 2 March 1935
Lanoe George Hawker VC (30 December 1890 – 23 November 1916)
Tyrrell Mann Hawker (20 August 1892 – November 1916)
George Charles Hawker, jun. (c. 1854 – 15 February 1889) married Joanna Fitzgerald Barr Smith (1866 – ) in 1886. Joanna was third daughter of Robert Barr Smith and Joanna Smith née Elder.
Elizabeth Seymour Hawker (1887 – )
Robert Barr Hawker (15 January 1889 – )
Michael Seymour Hawker (1857 – 1 August 1933) was born in South Australia and educated at Stubbington School and in Germany. On his father's death he managed Bungaree station. In 1906 the brothers dissolved their partnership and divided the property, Michael's portion being North Bungaree, near Spalding, where he successfully bred Merino sheep. He also had interests in Partacoona station, north of Quorn, McCoy's Well station, near Nackara, Mount Victor Station, near Yunta and others in Western Australia, Queensland and New South Wales. He married Elizabeth Begg McFarlane, daughter of Allan McFarlane jun. of Wellington Lodge, Lake Alexandrina, on 9 June 1891 and ten years later built an extensive residence in Aldgate, later St. Joseph's convent, subsequently a private residence.
Charles Allan Seymour Hawker (16 May 1894 – 25 October 1938), was a South Australian member of the Commonwealth House of Representatives from 1929 to 1938 and a member of the Lyons government. He was killed in the Kyeema crash.*Mary Blanche Hawker (1858 – 10 December 1945), married ophthalmologist Charles Gosse MD (c. 1849 – 1 July 1885), brother of the explorer William Gosse, on 11 May 1880. She left Australia after the accidental death of her husband and died at East Preston, Sussex.
Isabella Hawker (21 June 1860 – )
Walter Hawker (8 October 1861 – 30 October 1951) gained an M.D. at London University but never practised medicine, but founded the Anama stud near Clare where he bred merino sheep and Friesian cattle. He married Mary Faulkner ( – ) in London on 11 December 1888. They had a residence "Derrymor" at Glenside Road Crafers. (Derrymor was leased to Walter Hawker from 1907–1912. It was owned by his daughter Doris Philippa McFarlane from 1916–1924 and by another daughter Ruth Marjorie Gault from 1924–1947. Information retrieved from Lands Title records CT 600/164).
Trevor MacDonnell Hawker (1892–1958), lived in Western Australia
John Carey Hawker ( – ) married Joan Seymour Hawker ( – ) in 1935, inherited Anama stud. She was a daughter of A(rden) Seymour Hawker (1880–1953)
Ruth Marjorie Hawker (1897–1976) married Arthur Kyle Gault in 1921, lived at Medindie
Doris Philippa Hawker married Gordon Hector McFarlane on 19 April 1911.
Richard MacDonnell Hawker (1866 – 24 March 1930) studied medicine at Cambridge but never practised. He married Adelaide Tennant (22 July 1874 – 8 April 1952) on 25 February 1903 and inherited "Bungaree". Adelaide, a daughter of Andrew Tennant, was a notable horsewoman.
Rona Elizabeth Hawker (1904 – 1971) married Fredrick Rufane Levinge ( – 1890)
Richard George Hawker (1907–1982)
Peter Seymour Hawker (1910–1939)
Naomi Tennant Hawker (1914–1994)
David Hawker (1918–1986)
Bertram Robert Hawker (29 March 1868 – 1952) Anglican clergyman, educationist and benefactor, was born at Llandudno, Carnarvonshire, Wales, youngest of sixteen children of George Charles Hawker. At St Peter's Cathedral, Adelaide, on 23 July 1896 Hawker married Constance Victoria Buxton, daughter of Sir Thomas Buxton, the Governor of South Australia.

His brother James Collins Hawker (c. 1821–1901) arrived in SA aboard Pestonjee Bomanjee in October 1838. He became Comptroller of Customs at Port Adelaide and married Louisa, daughter of Captain Lipson.
Edward Lipson Hawker (1851 – 1927)
Elizabeth Emma Hawker (1852 – ) married land agent John James Neville Blyth, son of Arthur Blyth.
Edith Louisa Mary Hawker (1854 – )
Florence Adelaide Hawker (1856 – )
James Clarence Hawker (1859 – ) married Agnes Maud Phillips in 1887
Louisa Clarissa Hawker (1 July 1861 – ) married William Clarkson in 1887
Thomas Lipson Hawker (1863 – 21 October 1933) married Isabella Male ( – 1956)
Ethel Maude Hawker (1869 – )
Lilian Beatrice Hawker (1872 – ) married John MacKenzie Henry in 1901

Another brother (fourth son of Edward Hawker) Charles Lloyd Hawker (c. 1827 – 3 April 1861) also arrived September 1840 aboard Lysander. He married Emma Jane Digby ( – ) in England on 15 October 1850 and returned to Adelaide aboard Success in February 1851. Also aboard Success was his brother Alfred and (sister?) a Miss Hawker. He founded Anama sheepstud; died in Adelaide while he and his family were preparing to return to England.
Frederick Arthur Hawker (6 December 1851 – )
Charles Edward Hawker (19 August 1853 – )

The youngest brother Alfred Hawker (10 January 1831 – 10 February 1868) arrived aboard Success in February 1851. He made numerous trips between England and South Australia, and died at sea aboard St Leonards while en route to London. He never married.

The distinguished Australian aviation pioneer Harry Hawker was not a near relative.

See also
Hundred of Hawker
Hawker, South Australia

References

 

|-

|-

|-

|-

|-

|-

External links
Bungaree cemetery records

1818 births
1895 deaths
Members of the South Australian House of Assembly
Settlers of South Australia
Speakers of the South Australian House of Assembly
Treasurers of South Australia
English emigrants to colonial Australia
19th-century Australian politicians
Knights Bachelor